Rodgers Shelter Archeological Site, also known as the Missouri Archaeological Survey Number 23BE125, is a historic archaeological site located at Warsaw, Benton County, Missouri. It is a terrace level archaeological site along the Pomme de Terre River. The site was excavated by R. Bruce McMillan and Raymond Wood before it was submerged by the U. S. Army Corps of Engineers under the water of the Truman Reservoir. The stone tools from the site belong to Late Paleo-Indian (Dalton) Period, Middle Archaic, Late Archaic, and Woodland Period.

It was listed on the National Register of Historic Places in 1969.

References

Archaeological sites on the National Register of Historic Places in Missouri
Buildings and structures in Benton County, Missouri
National Register of Historic Places in Benton County, Missouri